The following is a list of films produced in the Tamil film industry in India in 1948 in alphabetical order.

1948

References 

Films, Tamil
Lists of 1948 films by country or language
1948
1940s Tamil-language films